Holiday Beach may refer to:

Holiday Beach, Texas
Holiday Beach, Hainan, China